The National Weather Service Baltimore/Washington is a local office of the National Weather Service responsible for monitoring weather conditions in 44 counties in eastern West Virginia, northern and central Virginia, the majority of the state of Maryland, as well as the city of Washington, D.C. Although labeled as the NWS Baltimore/Washington, its actual location is off Old Ox Road (Virginia State Route 606) in the Dulles section of Sterling, Virginia, adjacent to Washington Dulles International Airport.

The NWS Baltimore/Washington currently employs about 25 people including meteorologists, support personnel, and management staff, working rotating shifts 24 hours a day, 7 days a week.

As of November 10, 2020, the National Weather Service Baltimore/Washington is responsible for Cecil County, Maryland, rather than the National Weather Service Mount Holly/Philadelphia. As of the same date, the National Weather Service Baltimore/Washington is responsible for Garrett County, Maryland, rather than the National Weather Service Pittsburgh.

Jurisdictions served

District of Columbia
Washington, D.C.

Maryland

Counties
Allegany County
Anne Arundel County
Baltimore County
Calvert County
Carroll County
Cecil County (from November 10, 2020)
Charles County
Frederick County
Garrett County (from November 10, 2020)
Harford County
Howard County
Montgomery County
Prince George's County
St. Mary's County
Washington County

Independent city
City of Baltimore

Virginia

Counties
Albemarle County
Arlington County
Augusta County
Clarke County
Culpeper County
Fairfax County
Fauquier County
Frederick County
Greene County
Highland County
King George County
Loudoun County
Madison County
Nelson County
Orange County
Page County
Prince William County
Rappahannock County
Rockingham County
Shenandoah County
Spotsylvania County
Stafford County
Warren County

Independent cities
City of Alexandria
City of Charlottesville
City of Fairfax
City of Falls Church
City of Fredericksburg
City of Harrisonburg
City of Manassas
City of Manassas Park
City of Staunton
City of Waynesboro
City of Winchester

West Virginia
Berkeley County
Grant County
Hampshire County
Hardy County
Jefferson County
Mineral County
Morgan County
Pendleton County

Aviation weather services locations
Maryland
Baltimore–Washington International Airport (Linthicum)
Martin State Airport (Middle River)
Virginia
Charlottesville-Albemarle Airport (Charlottesville)
Ronald Reagan Washington National Airport (Arlington)
Washington Dulles International Airport (Chantilly/Sterling)
West Virginia
Shepherd Field/Eastern West Virginia Regional Airport (Martinsburg)

First-order/climate sites

Maryland
Baltimore–Washington International Airport (Linthicum)
Hagerstown Regional Airport
Maryland Science Center (Baltimore)
Virginia
Charlottesville-Albemarle Airport
Ronald Reagan Washington National Airport (Arlington)
Washington Dulles International Airport (Chantilly/Sterling)
West Virginia
Eastern WV Regional Airport (Martinsburg)

NOAA Weather Radio
The National Weather Service Baltimore/Washington forecast office provides programming for eight NOAA Weather Radio stations.

References

External links
 

Baltimore Washington
Baltimore–Washington metropolitan area